Marion Lenne is a French Member of Parliament from La République En Marche! (LREM). She was elected to the French National Assembly on 18 June 2017, representing the 5th constituency in the department of Haute-Savoie.

In July 2019, Lenne decided not to align with her parliamentary group's majority and became one of 52 LREM members who abstained from a vote on the French ratification of the European Union’s Comprehensive Economic and Trade Agreement (CETA) with Canada. In 2020, Lenne joined En commun (EC), a group within LREM led by Barbara Pompili.

See also
 2017 French legislative election

References

Year of birth missing (living people)
Living people
Deputies of the 15th National Assembly of the French Fifth Republic
La République En Marche! politicians
21st-century French women politicians
Place of birth missing (living people)
Women members of the National Assembly (France)
Union of Democrats and Independents politicians
Members of Parliament for Haute-Savoie